Jakub Grigar (born 27 April 1997) is a Slovak slalom canoeist who has competed at the international level since 2012.

Grigar competed at two Olympic Games. He finished 5th in the K1 event at the 2016 Summer Olympics in Rio de Janeiro and won the silver medal in the K1 event at the delayed 2020 Summer Olympics in Tokyo.

He also won two silver medals in the K1 team event at the ICF Canoe Slalom World Championships, earning them in 2015 and 2021.

World Cup individual podiums

References

External links

Jakub Grigar at the Slovenský Olympijský Výbor 

Slovak male canoeists
Living people
1997 births
Canoeists at the 2014 Summer Youth Olympics
Canoeists at the 2016 Summer Olympics
Olympic canoeists of Slovakia
Medalists at the ICF Canoe Slalom World Championships
Medalists at the 2020 Summer Olympics
Canoeists at the 2020 Summer Olympics
Olympic medalists in canoeing
Olympic silver medalists for Slovakia
Sportspeople from Liptovský Mikuláš